TASS Is Authorized to Declare... (translit. TASS upolnomochen zayavit...) is a 1984 Soviet spy miniseries directed by Vladimir Fokin. The series is set in Cold War era and portrays the struggle of Soviet and American intelligence agencies. It is based on a novel by the same name by Yulian Semyonov (the author of cult spy series Seventeen Moments of Spring). "17 Moments" star Vyacheslav Tikhonov played KGB General Konstantinov, the protagonist of the "TASS..." series.

Original film music score was composed by Eduard Artemyev as a blend of progressive rock and electronic music.

Plot  
Trianon (Boris Klyuyev), a willing mole agent for the Americans, is providing his CIA handlers in Moscow with information on Soviet supplies to the fictional African state of Nagonia which he obtains through his high-positioned expert job. The KGB counterintelligence painstakingly identifies and neutralizes him. Trianon kills his fiancee who raised suspicions on his double life and then attempts to commit suicide when arrested, but the KGB secures his apprehension and interrogation.

At the same time in Nagonia, Soviet counterintelligence agent Slavin (Yuri Solomin) risks his life assisting in identification of Trianon and preventing local CIA resident Glabb (Vakhtang Kikabidze) from staging a coup d'etat in the country by pro-American General Ogano against ruling progressive president Grisso. Several foreign whistleblowers providing Slavin with information are killed by Glabb's order.

As the result of successful KGB operation, the TASS state news agency issues a sensational news bulletin exposing the CIA plot.

Cast

 Vyacheslav Tikhonov as KGB General Konstantinov
 Yury Solomin as Slavin
 Nikolai Zasukhin as Makarov
 Aleksei Petrenko as Paul Dick, journalist
 Ivars Kalnins as Minayev
 Nikolai Mikheyev as Pavel Savelyevich Ozersky
 Nikolai Skorobogatov as Arkhipkin
 Mikhail Gluzsky as Fyodorov
 Irina Alfyorova as Olga Winter
 Vladlen Davydov as Yeryomin
 Boris Khimichev as Michael Welsh
 Georgi Tejkh as Nelson Grin
 Mikhail Zhigalov as Paramonov
 Aristarkh Livanov as  Welsh's assistant
 Vladimir Mashchenko as Shargin
 Zhanna Prokhorenko as Paramonova
 Vakhtang Kikabidze as John Glabb, CIA resident to Nagonia
 Eleonora Zubkova as Pilar, Glabb's mistress
 Bolot Bejshenaliyev as Lao
 Vladimir Belousov as Tsyzin
 Vatslav Dvorzhetsky as Professor Winter
 Konstantin Karelskikh as Luns
 Aleksandr Karin as KGB officer
 Vadim Andreev as Dronov, KGB lieutenant
 Boris Klyuyev as Sergey Dubov (Agent 'Trianon')
 Erwin Knausmüller as U.S. Ambassador
 Kalifa Konde as Ogano
 Ermengeld Konovalov as Stau
 Leonid Kuravlyov as Zotov
 Marina Levtova as Olga Vronskaya
 Pavel Makhotin as Yarantsev
 Heino Mandri as Lorence, former CIA resident to Nagonia, killed by Glabb
 Mikk Mikiver as Donald Gee, journalist
 Aleksandr Pashutin as Gmyrya
 Tatyana Plotnikova as Niyazmetova
 Viktor Shulgin as Vogulyov
 Eduard Martsevich as Dmitry Stepanov, a Soviet journalist
 Lyudmila Solodenko as Doctor
 Lembit Ulfsak as Schleyer
 Valentina Titova as Potapenko
 Olga Volkova as Emma Schanz, previous Glabb's wife
 Leonid Yarmolnik as Grechayev
 Georgi Yumatov as Ivan Belyu
 Boris Bystrov as Agafonov, a KGB major, the investigator
 Nadezhda Babkina as cameo
 Stunts by Oleg Fedulov

See also 
 Aleksandr Dmitrievich Ogorodnik

References

External links

1984 television films
1984 films
Soviet television films
Cold War spy films
1980s Russian-language films
Gorky Film Studio films
Soviet television miniseries
Films scored by Eduard Artemyev
Films set in Moscow
Films set in Africa
1980s Soviet television series
1980s spy films
1980s television miniseries